Events from the year 1829 in the United Kingdom.

Incumbents
 Monarch – George IV
 Prime Minister – Arthur Wellesley, 1st Duke of Wellington (Tory)
 Foreign Secretary – George Hamilton-Gordon, 4th Earl of Aberdeen
 Parliament – 8th

Events

 8 January – hanging of body-selling murderer William Burke in Edinburgh. His associate William Hare, who has testified against him, is released.
 26 January – first performance of Douglas Jerrold's comic nautical melodrama Black-Eyed Susan; or, All in the Downs at the Surrey Theatre in Lambeth; it will run for a new record of well over 150 performances.
 1–2 February – York Minster is extensively damaged in a fire started by Jonathan Martin (who is subsequently acquitted of arson on the grounds of insanity).
 21 March – a duel is fought between the Prime Minister (the Duke of Wellington) and George Finch-Hatton, 10th Earl of Winchilsea, in Battersea Fields, provoked by the Duke's support for Catholic emancipation and foundation of the secular King's College London. Deliberately off-target shots are fired by both and honour is satisfied without injury.
 27 March – Zoological Society of London receives its royal charter.
 April–September – the composer Felix Mendelssohn pays his first visit to Britain. This includes (June) the first London performance of his concert overture to A Midsummer Night's Dream and (August) his trip to Fingal's Cave.
 13 April – passage of the Roman Catholic Relief Act by Parliament of the United Kingdom granting Catholic Emancipation.

 5 June – slave trade:  captures the armed slave ship Voladora off the coast of Cuba.
 10 June – the Oxford University Boat Club wins the first inter-university Boat Race, rowed at Henley-on-Thames.
 19 June – Robert Peel's Metropolitan Police Act establishes the Metropolitan Police Service.
 30 June – Henry Robinson Palmer files a patent application for corrugated iron for use in buildings.
 4 July – George Shillibeer begins operating the first bus service in London.
 2–3 August – the "Muckle Spate", a great flood of the River Findhorn which devastates much of Strathspey, Scotland, washing away many bridges.
 14 August – King's College London founded by Royal Charter
 29 September – the first police officers of the Metropolitan Police Service, known by the nicknames "bobbies" or "peelers", go on patrol in London.
 8 October – George Stephenson's steam locomotive, The Rocket, defeats John Ericsson's Novelty and thus wins The Rainhill Trials held near Liverpool.
 4 December – in the face of fierce opposition, British Lord William Bentinck carries a regulation declaring that all who abet suttee in India are guilty of culpable homicide.
 13 December – last British hanging for forgery – Thomas Maynard.
 Undated – last of the Bounty mutineers dies at Pitcairn Island.

Ongoing events
 Anglo-Ashanti war (1823–1831)

Publications
 Thomas Carlyle's essay Signs of the Times.
 Thomas Love Peacock's novel The Misfortunes of Elphin (anonymous).
 Walter Scott's novel Anne of Geierstein (anonymous).

Births
 17 January – Catherine Booth, Mother of The Salvation Army (died 1890)
 2 February – William Stanley, inventor (died 1909)
 6 March – Arthur Blomfield, architect (died 1899)
 10 April – William Booth, founder of The Salvation Army (died 1912)
 4 June – Allan Octavian Hume, member of the Indian civil service and "the Father of Indian Ornithology" (died 1912)
 5 June – George Stephen, 1st Baron Mount Stephen, Scottish-born businessman in Canada and philanthropist (died 1921)
 8 June – John Everett Millais, Pre-Raphaelite painter (died 1896)
 16 June – Bessie Rayner Parkes, journalist and feminist (died 1925)
 14 July – Edward White Benson, Archbishop of Canterbury (died 1896)
 25 July – Elizabeth Siddal, Pre-Raphaelite artists' model, painter and poet (died 1862)
 25 September – William Michael Rossetti, critic (died 1919)
 9 November – Sir Peter Lumsden, Scottish general in the Indian army (died 1918)
 John Lowther du Plat Taylor, founder of the Army Post Office Corps (died 1904)

Deaths
 15 January – John Mastin, local historian, memoirist and clergyman (born 1747)
 25 January – William Shield, composer, violinist and violist (born 1748)
 28 January – William Burke, murderer and grave robber, executed (born 1792 in Ireland)
 1 March – Thomas Earnshaw, watchmaker (born 1749)
 8 May – Charles Abbot, 1st Baron Colchester, barrister, statesman, Speaker of the House of Commons (born 1759)
 10 May –  Thomas Young, physician and linguist (born 1773)
 29 May – Sir Humphry Davy, chemist (born 1778)
 27 June – James Smithson, mineralogist, chemist and sponsor of the Smithsonian Institution (born 1765)
 7 August – John Reeves, conservative activist, public servant and legal historian (born 1752)
 10 October – Maria Elizabetha Jacson, botanist (born 1755)
 28 December – Bill Richmond, bare-knuckle welterweight boxer (born 1763 in British America)

See also
 1829 in Scotland

References

 
Years of the 19th century in the United Kingdom